Patrick Marcelino (born 4 March 1994), simply known as Patrick, is a Brazilian footballer who plays for Marcílio Dias as a right back

Career statistics

References

External links

Patrick Marcelino at Flash Resultats

1994 births
Living people
Brazilian footballers
Brazilian expatriate footballers
Association football defenders
Campeonato Brasileiro Série B players
Tanabi Esporte Clube players
Associação Ferroviária de Esportes players
Boa Esporte Clube players
Kashiwa Reysol players
F.C. Penafiel players
Oeste Futebol Clube players
Fortaleza Esporte Clube players
Vila Nova Futebol Clube players
Brazilian expatriate sportspeople in Japan
Brazilian expatriate sportspeople in Portugal
Expatriate footballers in Japan
Expatriate footballers in Portugal
People from Osasco
Footballers from São Paulo (state)